William Waterman may refer to:

William Waterman, see Thomas Churchyard
William Waterman (MP), MP for Guildford
William H. Waterman of the Waterman family

See also
William Waterman House, Rhode Island